Sabacolypse: A Change Gon' Come is the debut solo studio album by American rapper Sabac Red. It was released on June 15, 2004 via Psycho+Logical-Records. Production was handled entirely by Necro. It features guest appearances from Antwon Lamar Robinson, Cenophia Mitchell, Dash Mihok, Immortal Technique, Jamal Joseph, Mr. Hyde, Necro, Q-Unique, Roosevelt Phillip, Vinnie Paz, and his fellow Non Phixion groupmates.

Track listing

Personnel

 John "Sabac Red" Fuentes – vocals, arranger, recording, mixing, artwork, photography
 Ron "Necro" Braunstein – vocals (tracks: 4, 11), Fender Jazz Bass (tracks: 15, 18), guitar & bass (track 20), producer, recording, mixing, executive producer, photography
 Jamal Joseph – spoken word (tracks: 5, 9, 14)
 Felipe "Immortal Technique" Coronel – vocals (track 8)
 Roosevelt Phillip – vocals (track 8)
 Christopher "Mr. Hyde" Catenacci – vocals (track 11)
 Mitchell "Goretex" Manzanilla – vocals (track 11)
 William "Ill Bill" Braunstein – vocals (track 11)
 Antwon Lamar Robinson – vocals (tracks: 15, 20)
 Vincenzo "Vinnie Paz" Luvineri – vocals (track 16)
 Anthony "Q-Unique" Quiles – vocals (track 16)
 Dash Mihok – vocals (track 19)
 Cenophia Mitchell – vocals (track 19), backing vocals (tracks: 4, 9, 14, 18)
 Eric "DJ Eclipse" Winn – scratches (tracks: 4, 17)
 Elliott Thomas – piano (tracks: 9, 14, 18), recording, mixing
 Charles De Montebello – mastering
 Hobin Choi – photography
 Ricky Powell – photography
 C. Ramirez – photography
 J.P. – photography

References

External links

2004 debut albums
Psycho+Logical-Records albums